Michelle Toro (née Williams; born January 2, 1991) is a Canadian competition swimmer who specializes in the freestyle in the sprint distances. She won a gold medal in the 2015 Pan American Games in Toronto in the 4 x 100 m freestyle and in the 4 x 100 m medley relay. She also won a bronze at the 2014 Commonwealth Games in the 4 x 100 m freestyle.

She competed as part of Canada's Olympic team for the 2016 Summer Olympics, commonly known as Rio 2016. Williams would help fellow Canadians Taylor Ruck, Chantal van Landeghem and Sandrine Mainville in the women's 4 x 100 m freestyle relay heats, with the team swimming the third fastest time. She then had to make way for teenage star Penelope Oleksiak in the final, where Oleksiak helped anchor the team to the bronze medal. In an interview after the event, Williams said "we've come a long way, this group of us. It's our medal and it's our medal for Canada, it's just so amazing."

Personal
Williams was born in Pretoria, South Africa and speaks fluent Afrikaans alongside English, she often goes back to South Africa to visit her family in Jeffreys Bay. In December 2016, shortly after the Short Course World Swimming Championships, she married her childhood teammate Guillermo Toro. They met when she was 12 and he was 14 at the North York Aquatic Club and started dating six years later.

See also
 List of Olympic medalists in swimming (women)
 List of Commonwealth Games medallists in swimming (women)

References

External links
 
 
 
 
 
 
 

1991 births
Living people
Canadian female freestyle swimmers
Commonwealth Games bronze medallists for Canada
Pan American Games gold medalists for Canada
Swimmers at the 2016 Summer Olympics
People from Pretoria
Medalists at the 2016 Summer Olympics
Olympic swimmers of Canada
Olympic bronze medalists for Canada
Olympic bronze medalists in swimming
Swimmers at the 2014 Commonwealth Games
Commonwealth Games medallists in swimming
Medalists at the FINA World Swimming Championships (25 m)
Pan American Games medalists in swimming
Swimmers at the 2015 Pan American Games
Medalists at the 2015 Pan American Games
Medallists at the 2014 Commonwealth Games